A Beautiful Affair is a 2012 Philippine romantic melodrama television series starring John Lloyd Cruz & Bea Alonzo together with John Estrada. The series premiered on ABS-CBN's Primetime Bida evening block and worldwide on TFC from October 29, 2012 to January 18, 2013, replacing Walang Hanggan and was replaced by Kailangan Ko'y Ikaw. The drama revolves around two lost souls who meet and fall in love in the city of Vienna in Austria.

Overview

Background
A Beautiful Affair is the highly anticipated drama series celebrating Bea Alonzo and John Lloyd Cruz's 10th anniversary as an on-screen love team. According to series director, Katski Flores, the drama began as a film concept in 2007 inspired loosely by Camelot and The Fountainhead. The drama was first hinted by ABS-CBN in November 2011 as a blind item, however several articles were released a month later from various sources confirming this. The drama is produced under the unit of Laurenti Dyogi and directed by Katski Flores whose first work on television was headwriting Cruz and Alonzo's first drama together titled, Kay Tagal Kang Hinintay back in 2002. Filming began on May 16, 2012 in Vienna and Salzburg, Austria. With its high budget, the drama filmed internationally for the second time in Japan in December 2012.

Premise
Leon (John Lloyd Cruz) is an architect who loses the will to live after his mother's death. In Vienna, he meets Gen (Bea Alonzo) a woman who suffers from a broken heart after finding out that her fiancé was cheating on her. Hoping to reclaim themselves and move on from their painful past, they venture to find love and romance. However, due to certain circumstances, they decide to part ways. A year later, fate brings them together again, but unbeknownst to Leon, Gen is already in love with another man who happens to be his adoptive brother, Edward (John Estrada) and is set to marry her.

Cast and characters

Main cast
 John Lloyd Cruz as Napoleon "Leon" Riego 
 Bea Alonzo as Genevieve "Gen" Saavedra
 John Estrada as Edward Pierro

Supporting cast
 Eula Valdez as Carlotta Pierro
 Dimples Romana as Emilia "Emy" Biglang-awa
 Megan Young as Ava Pierro
 Jaime Fabregas as Arturo Pierro
 John Arcilla as Leopoldo "Epong" Riego
 Ana Roces as Natalia Saavedra
 Janus del Prado as Fred Macatangay
 Regine Tolentino as Sophia Imperial
 Erika Padilla as Dr. Trina Cawagas
 Angelina Kanapi as Sabrina Saavedra-Reyes
 Sandy Aloba as Mona
 Slater Young as Harry Reyes
 Bugoy Cariño as Ivan
 Maria Anna Krynessa Rivera as Lala

Guest cast
 Menggie Cobarrubias as Julio Santillian
 Maliksi Morales as Ferdie Macatangay
 Edward Mendez as Martin Santillian
 Lito Pimentel as Rex Resureccion
 Bing Davao as Venicio
 Jason Francisco as Nelson
 Tetchie Agbayani as Tala
 Matthew Mendoza as Winston
 Beverly Salviejo as Ason
 Ricardo Cepeda as Akira Yamamoto
 Miki Tokugawa as a Japanese tea ceremony teacher

Special participation
 Maritoni Fernandez as Evelyn Saavedra
 Allan Paule as Henry Lumayang
 Jim Paredes as Stephen Saavedra
 Tanya Gomez as Rosario "Osang" Riego
 Carlo Romero as Jake Montgomery
 Andre Garcia as young Leon
 Alexa Ilacad as young Gen

Soundtrack
A Beautiful Affair: Original Soundtrack
 Artist: Various
 Released: 2012
 Label: Star Records
 Language: Filipino, English
 Format: Studio album (CD)
 Genre: OPM, Ballad

Track list and duration
 After All – Martin Nievera & Vina Morales – 4:37
 I'll Take Care Of You – Richard Poon – 4:20
 Ikaw At Ako – Johnoy Danao – 5:10
 Akala Mo – Juris – 3:53
 Wag Kanang Umiyak – KZ Tandingan – 4:40
 Paano Ba Ang Magmahal? – Erik Santos & Liezel Garcia – 4:27
 After All – Yeng Constantino & Sam Milby – 3:57
 Naaalala Ka – John Lloyd Cruz & Bea Alonzo – 4:22

Total running time: 35:26

See also
 List of programs broadcast by ABS-CBN
 List of ABS-CBN drama series

References

External links 

Official website

ABS-CBN drama series
2012 Philippine television series debuts
2013 Philippine television series endings
Philippine melodrama television series
Philippine romance television series
Television shows filmed in the Philippines
Television shows filmed in Austria
Television shows filmed in Japan
Filipino-language television shows